Loren LaPorte is an American softball coach who is the current head coach at James Madison.

Coaching career

James Madison
On July 31, 2012, LaPorte was announced as an assistant coach of the James Madison softball program.

On September 14, 2017, Loren LaPorte was promoted to head coach of the James Madison softball program after the departure of Mickey Dean who left for Auburn.

Head coaching record

College

References

Living people
Female sports coaches
American softball coaches
Year of birth missing (living people)
Radford Highlanders softball coaches
James Madison Dukes softball coaches
Roanoke College alumni
People from Northumberland County, Virginia